The 1960 FA Charity Shield was the 38th FA Charity Shield, a  football match between the winners of the previous season's First Division and FA Cup titles. The match was contested by league champions Burnley and FA Cup winners Wolverhampton Wanderers. 

The two clubs had been the main challengers for the league title the previous season, with Burnley pipping Wolves by just a single point. This denied the Midlands club a third successive league championship, and the first 'double' of the 20th century.
 
The match was staged at Burnley's home ground, Turf Moor. The game ended a 2–2 draw, meaning the Shield was shared.

Match details

1960
Charity Shield 1960
Charity Shield 1960
Charity Shield
Charity Shield